Jalan Jengka 1, Federal Route 1542, is a main federal road in Bandar Pusat Jengka, Pahang, Malaysia.

At most sections, the Federal Route 1542 was built under the JKR R5 road standard, allowing maximum speed limit of up to 90 km/h.

List of junctions and towns 

Malaysian Federal Roads